Notte Illuminata is an album released in 2011 by Italian tenor, Andrea Bocelli.

A collection of arias in German, French, Italian and English, the album is Bocelli's first to be released only digitally.

Notte Illuminata Tour
The Notte Illuminata Tour was launched in Pisa, at the Teatro Verdi, December 2010. This was followed by three concerts given in January, in Munich, Berlin, and Hamburg, Germany. In February, Bocelli made his Metropolitan Opera debut, performing a recital, as part of the tour.

Track listing

 La Speme Ti Consoli - 3:26 
 Where E'er You Walk - 4:08
 Sound An Alarm - 2:40 
 Dimmi Ben Mio Che M'ami - 1:59 
 L'amante Impaziente - 1:23 
 Beato Quei Che Fido Amor - 2:30 
 Ich Liebe Dich - 2:14 
 Der Engel - 2:26 
 Oh, Quand Je Dors - 3:46 
 Zueignung - 1:45 
 Mai - 3:14 
 Chanson D'amour - 1:59 
 Apres Un Reve - 3:27 
 La Lune Blanche Luit Dans Les Bois - 2:27 
 Le Secret - 1:41 
 Mandoline - 1:49 
 Hynne A La Nuit - 3:25 
 A La Madone - 2:25 
 Invocation - 3:01 
 La Reine Du Matin - 3:11

References

External links
Notte Illuminata on iTunes

Andrea Bocelli albums
Decca Records albums
2011 classical albums